Ahmad bin Mohamed Mattar (born 13 August 1940) is a former Singaporean politician and member of the Cabinet.

Education 
An alumnus of Raffles Institution, Ahmad graduated from the University of Singapore with a degree in physics in 1963. He completed his master's degree at the University of Sheffield on a Colombo Plan scholarship and then his doctorate at the University of Singapore.

Career 
He was a lecturer at Singapore Polytechnic and conducted the first large-scale study on the effects of traffic noise on housing estates; the study would later inform future legislations and studies on traffic noise. 

Ahmad was also the founding president of Mendaki (1982–1989), which was established to look into the educational and welfare needs of the Malay/Muslim community.

Political career 
In 1972, he ran for the Leng Kee Single Member Constituency at the recommendation of Abdul Rahim Ishak, then the MP for Siglap SMC. From 1985 to 1995, he was appointed as the Minister for the Environment. During his tenure as the Minister for the Environment, he was known for tightening restrictions on the sale of aerosols containing CFCs and introducing the Corrective work order (CWO) to combat littering. He had intended to resign from Cabinet in 1991 but was persuaded to remain by newly elected Prime Minister Goh Chok Tong. In 1996 he retired from politics and has largely kept a low profile.

References

External links
Ahmad Mattar – Singapore Infopedia (National Library Board)

Living people
1940 births
People's Action Party politicians
Raffles Institution alumni
Singaporean people of Malay descent
Singaporean Muslims
University of Singapore alumni
Alumni of the University of Sheffield
Environment ministers of Singapore
Members of the Cabinet of Singapore
Members of the Parliament of Singapore